William “Bill” Worsley (11 September 1869 – 13 November 1918) was an English cricketer active from 1903 to 1913 who played for Lancashire. He was born in Wandsworth and died in Accrington. He was a coal miner who played for Church in the Lancashire League. He appeared in 136 first-class matches as a right-handed tail end batsman and wicketkeeper. He scored 628 runs with a highest score of 37* and held 239 catches with 45 stumpings. In 1907, Worsley equalled the still-unbeaten world record of being dismissed without scoring in six consecutive innings.

Cricket writer and journalist Neville Cardus relates the story of Worsley’s debut for Lancashire at Edgbaston. He celebrated his call up with a crême de menthe before standing up to stumps for the bowling of the fast Walter Brearley effecting two brilliant catches down the leg side.

Notes

1869 births
1918 deaths
English cricketers
Lancashire cricketers